Arctobyrrhus subcanus is a species of pill beetle in the family Byrrhidae. It is found in North America.

References

Further reading

 
 

Byrrhidae
Articles created by Qbugbot
Beetles described in 1878